Moose Lake is a lake located near the Saskatchewan River delta in Manitoba, Canada. It is separated into two irregularly shaped lobes, North Moose Lake and South Moose Lake, by the Moose Lake Narrows Control Structure, which was built in 1964. South Moose Lake drains south into Cedar Lake via Moose Creek; these two lakes form the reservoir of the Grand Rapids Generating Station, and the sluice gates at Moose Lake Narrows helps regulate their water levels. The community of Moose Lake is located on the south shore of the lake.

Human activity
A portage between the eastern end of South Moose Lake and the source of the Minago River was used by fur traders to travel between the Saskatchewan and Nelson Rivers. Most if not all of the semi-nomadic Cree who originally frequented the area around Moose Lake died in a smallpox epidemic during the winter of 1781–1782. The area was subsequently settled by Swampy Cree migrating from the east.

Today, logging, fishing and trapping are practiced in the Moose Lake area. Tom Lamb operated a cattle ranch at Moose Lake from 1953 to 1964, when flooding of the area by the Grand Rapids hydroelectric project forced its closure. The building of the Grand Rapids Dam caused the inundation of 66% of the territory held by the Moose Lake Cree, with correspondingly and predictably disastrous consequences for the community: previously important economic activities such as moose hunting were eliminated, and substance abuse among children, crime, and alcoholism had become rampant by the late 1970s. A settlement for damages caused by the Grand Rapids project was signed by the Mosakahiken Cree Nation and the province of Manitoba in 2008.

References

Lakes of Manitoba